Katherine Sinead Kelly (born 19 November 1979) is an English actress and presenter, who made her TV debut in 2003, appearing on Last of the Summer Wine. Kelly rose to prominence after portraying Becky McDonald in the ITV soap opera Coronation Street between 2006 and 2012. For this role, Kelly won multiple awards including a National Television Award for "Best Serial Drama Performance" in 2012. 

Since leaving Coronation Street, she has played Lady Mae in the ITV drama series Mr Selfridge (2013–2014, 2016), Leah Dale in ITV drama Cheat (2019) and a lead role in the second series of Innocent as Sally Wright (2021). Kelly is also known for her roles in Happy Valley, Class, The Night Manager (2016), Criminal: UK (2019–present), and as DI Karen Renton in the second series of Liar (2020).

Early life
Kelly was born in Barnsley, South Yorkshire. She grew up in both South Yorkshire and the USA. She has strong links with The Lamproom Theatre in Barnsley, established in 1998 by her father John (who is originally from Castleisland, County Kerry, Ireland), and has regularly supported fund-raising events held there. She trained at the Royal Academy of Dramatic Art with fellow students Meredith MacNeill, Leo Bill, Elliot Cowan, Laurence Fox, and actor/novelist, Anna Hope, graduating in 2001.

Career 
Kelly starred in ITV soap opera Coronation Street as Becky McDonald from 2006 until 2012.

Kelly appeared on the 2010 album, Coronation Street: Rogues, Angels, Heroes & Fools. Kelly, in character as Becky McDonald, sang the lead single from the album, If It's Too Late, which was remixed by former PWL and Stock Aitken Waterman "Mixmaster", Pete Hammond. Coronation Street.

After she left Coronation Street, she starred as Miss Hardcastle in She Stoops to Conquer at the National Theatre from 24 January 2012.

Kelly's first television role after leaving Coronation Street was in the 90-minute BBC Four biopic The Best Possible Taste, in which she played Lee Middleton, wife of Kenny Everett. In early 2013 she played socialite Lady Loxley in the ten part ITV drama series Mr Selfridge, later signing on to appear in the second series of the show in 2014 and its final series in 2016.

Later in 2013 she joined the lead cast of The Field of Blood, based on the novel by Denise Mina. Kelly played Maloney, an ambitious woman in the "ferociously male-dominated world of 1980s newspaper journalism". Also that year she starred in the three part ITV thriller, The Guilty, as Claire Reid, mother to a missing five-year-old child.

In 2014 she played Alaura Kingsley in the critically acclaimed production of City of Angels at the Donmar Warehouse directed by Josie Rourke.

In August 2015 it was announced that Kelly would join the cast of Happy Valley, which aired the following year. In the series Kelly portrays DI Jodie Shackleton, a part that was written for her by series creator Sally Wainwright. Kelly enjoyed the opportunity to play a character in her native Yorkshire accent, and prepared for the role by shadowing police detectives in Halifax. Also in 2016 she appeared as the Permanent Secretary in four episodes of The Night Manager.

On 4 April 2016, it was announced that Kelly would appear in the BBC Three Doctor Who spin-off series Class written by Patrick Ness, airing from October 2016. In October 2016, Kelly appeared as Hannah in ITV drama Him.

In 2018, Kelly made her first film appearance since 2009 in Dirty God, playing Lisa, the protagonist Jade's mother. The following year, Kelly appeared in the feature film Official Secrets, based on the real life events of intelligence whistleblower Katharine Gun (portrayed by Keira Knightley). In the film, Kelly plays Jacqueline Jones, an MI6 agent who tacitly confirms the legitimacy of Gun's leaked memo to a journalist contact at The Observer.

The same year, Kelly appeared in an episode of Flack, as Brooke. Later that year, Kelly portrayed Leah in four part ITV drama Cheat. She plays DI Karen Renton in the second series of Liar for ITV/Two Brothers Pictures.  In September, 2019, Netflix released its mini-series Criminal: UK with Kelly in the role of the lead investigator.

Kelly joined the cast of Liar for its second series in 2020, playing Detective Karen Renton. A character bio for Renton describes her as an “unconventional” officer, whose “bluntness” often ruffles feathers. Of her role, Kelly stated “It's my belief that Karen Renton is that way because she has to be that, and if she wasn't that, I wouldn't believe that out of all the detectives that they could send from the Met to solve this front-page news story, why would they pick her if she wasn't excellent at her job?," she said. “I think she would have been chosen because she can act very quickly and very swiftly, and she has great instincts."

Personal life
Kelly married Ryan Clark in 2013 in Las Vegas. In 2014, she gave birth to their first child, a daughter named Orla Kelly Clark. On 21 October 2016, she gave birth to a second daughter, Rose Christie Clark. In August 2020 the couple announced their separation when Kelly relocated from her home in North London to her home town of Barnsley.

Filmography

Television

Film

Audio

Awards and nominations

National Television Awards
 Best Serial Drama Performance 2008 – nominated
 Best Serial Drama Performance 2010 – nominated
 Best Serial Drama Performance 2011 – nominated
 Best Serial Drama Performance – 2012 – won

British Soap Awards
 Best Actress 2008 – nominated
 Best Comedy Performance 2008 – nominated
 Best On-Screen Partnership 2008 (shared with David Neilson) – nominated
 Best Actress 2009 – won
 Best On-Screen Partnership 2009 (shared with Simon Gregson) – nominated
 Sexiest Female 2009 – nominated
 Best Actress 2010 – nominated
 Best On-Screen Partnership 2010 (shared with Simon Gregson) – nominated
 Best Actress 2011 – nominated
 Best On-Screen Partnership 2011 (shared with Simon Gregson) – nominated
 Best Exit 2012 – won

Other
 Royal Television Society North West Awards 2008 – 'Best Performance in a Continuing Drama' – nominated
 TV Times Awards 2008 – 'Editors Choice' – won
 TRIC Awards 2009 – 'Best Soap Personality' – won
 TV Now Awards 2009 – 'Favourite Soap Female' – won
 TV Now Awards 2009 –  'Favourite Soap Couple' – (shared with Simon Gregson) – won
 TV Quick & TV Choice Awards 2009 – 'Best Soap Actress' – won
 TV Times Awards 2009 – 'Favourite Soap Star' – nominated
 Royal Television Society North West Awards 2009 – 'Best Performance in a Continuing Drama' – nominated
 TV Times Awards 2009 – 'Favourite Double Act' – (shared with Simon Gregson) – nominated
 All About Soap Bubble Awards 2010 – 'Bride and Doom' (shared with Simon Gregson) – won
 All About Soap Bubble Awards 2010 – 'Celeb Style' – nominated
 TV Now Awards 2010 – 'Favourite Soap Female' – won
 TV Quick Awards 2010 – 'Best Soap Actress' – shortlisted
 TV Times Awards 2010 – 'Favourite Soap Star' – nominated
 Inside Soap Awards 2010 – 'Best Actress' – shortlisted
 Inside Soap Awards 2010 – 'Best Wedding' (shared with Simon Gregson) – shortlisted
 All About Soap Bubble Awards 2011 – 'Best Actress' – nominated
 TV Quick Awards 2011 – 'Best Soap Actress' – shortlisted
 Inside Soap Awards 2011 – 'Best Actress' – shortlisted
 Inside Soap Awards 2011 – 'Best Dramatic Performance' – nominated
 Inside Soap Awards 2011 – 'Best Wedding' (shared with Simon Gregson) – nominated
 Shorty Awards 2012 – 'Best Actress' – nominated

References

External links
 

Alumni of RADA
English soap opera actresses
English television actresses
English film actresses
English people of Irish descent
1979 births
Living people
Actors from Barnsley
Actresses from Yorkshire